The Communauté de communes Moret Seine et Loing is a federation of municipalities (communauté de communes) in the Seine-et-Marne département and in the Île-de-France région of France. Its area is 228.2 km2, and its population was 38,818 in 2018.

Composition
The communauté de communes consists of the following 18 communes:

Champagne-sur-Seine
Dormelles
Flagy
La Genevraye
Montigny-sur-Loing
Moret-Loing-et-Orvanne
Nanteau-sur-Lunain
Nonville
Paley
Remauville
Saint-Mammès
Thomery
Treuzy-Levelay
Vernou-la-Celle-sur-Seine
Villecerf
Villemaréchal
Villemer
Ville-Saint-Jacques

See also
Communes of the Seine-et-Marne department

References

Intercommunalities of Seine-et-Marne
Commune communities in France